Highs in the Mid-Sixties, Volume 18 (subtitled Colorado) is a compilation album in the Highs in the Mid-Sixties series, featuring recordings that were released in Colorado.  This is the only state featured in this series that is limited to only one LP.

Release data
This album was released in 1985 as an LP by AIP Records (as #AIP-10027).

Notes on the tracks
These tracks include several covers, including two Rolling Stones songs ("Nanker Phelge" is a songwriting pseudonym that the band used for collaborative writing efforts on many of their early songs).  

The Moonrakers were originally known as the Surfin' Classics and, like many 1960s garage rock bands, have a website and had a 2006 reunion concert. Guitarist Bob Webber of the Moonrakers founded Sugarloaf with Jerry Corbetta, who brought in drummer Robert MacVittie and rhythm guitarist Veeder Van Dorn III from this band as well.

The title of the psychedelic instrumental "Music to Smoke Bananas By" refers to the urban legend prevalent in the late 1960s that banana peel scrapings have an LSD-like effect if dried and then smoked like marijuana.

Track listing

Side 1

 The Astronauts: "Come along Baby" (Stormy Patterson) — rel. 1962
 The Soul: "Have it All Your Way" (The Soul)
 The Trolls: "I Don't Recall" (R. Gonzales)
 The Trolls: "Stupid Girl" (Mick Jagger/Keith Richards)
 The Poor: "She's Got the Time (She's Got the Changes)" (Tom Shipley) — rel. 1967
 The Soothsayers: "I Don't Know" (D. VanOmen/G. Finney) — rel. 1966
 The Moonrakers: "I Don't Believe" (L. E. Paul)
 Sur Royal Da Count: "Scream Mother Scream" (Joe Yore)

Side 2
 Our Gang: "Careless Love" (D. Duvall)
 The Moonrakers: "Baby Please Don't Go" (Big Joe Williams)
 The Moonrakers: "I'm All Right" (Nanker/Phelge)
 The Lidos: "Since I Last Saw You" (G. Nale/G. Fick/D. Silvis/R. Saunar)
 The Rainy Daze: "Fe Fi Fo Fum" (Tim Gilbert/John Carter) — rel. 1967
 The Doppler Effect: "God Is Alive in Argentina" (The Doppler Effect)
 The Monocles: "Psychedelic (That's Where it's At)" (Joe Floth/Robb Cassaday/Don Hirschfield/Behm/Hull) — rel. 1966
 The Elopers: "Music to Smoke Bananas By" (Jay Weatherington) — rel. 1967

Pebbles (series) albums
1985 compilation albums
Music of Colorado